From the very start of the tournament, Thailand looked good for the title.

Championship

Group stage
The five teams played one another over three days, with the top two advancing to the final.

  10 – 1 
  12 – 0 
  14 – 2 
  14 – 3 
  0 – 3 
  0 – 3 
  4 – 1 
  7 – 4 
  9 – 4 
  9 – 5

Final

Champions

References

External links
 Old website (Archived)
 Official website

AFF Futsal Championship
2001 in AFF football
2001
AFF